Northville Public Schools (NPS) is a school district headquartered in Northville, Michigan. The district serves Novi Township, Northville, and portions of Novi, Lyon Township, and Salem Township. Some areas are near South Lyon.

The district operates six elementary schools, two middle schools, one high school and two special education buildings. The district serves approximately 6,110 students in its K–12 program, 250 students in its special education program, and 850 students in its pre-school/child-care programs.

History
Around 2005, the district had a constant increase of 300 students per year.

Service area
Within Wayne County the school serves the county's portion of Northville and most of Northville Township. Within Oakland County the school serves that county's portion of Northville, as well as Novi Township, the southwestern part of the city of Novi, and a southeastern part of Lyon Charter Township. Within Washtenaw County it serves a small part of Salem Township.

Demographics
The languages other than English most common in the district, as of 2013, were Arabic, Chinese, Gujarati, Hindi, Japanese, Korean, Punjabi, Spanish, Tamil, Telugu, and Urdu.

The languages other than English most common in the district, as of 2012, were Arabic, Chinese, German, Hindi, Japanese, Korean, Punjabi, Spanish, Telugu, and Urdu.

Schools

High school
Northville High School (Northville Township, grades 9–12, known as the Mustangs, opened 1959, moved to current facility in 2000. Northville High School will start its own ASD classroom for students with moderate to severe autism.

Middle schools
Hillside Middle School (Northville), grades 6–8, known as the Raiders, opened 2000, housed in the original Northville High School building. Hillside also houses the District wide's ASD classroom, K–5 for moderately to severely challenged students with Autism. As well as the special needs cross-categorical classroom and some classes for the Cooke School Students.(Colors are red and black)
Meads Mill Middle School  (Northville Township), grades 6–8, known as the Patriots, opened 1976. (Colors are maroon and gold)

Hillside and Meads Mill have a fierce but friendly rivalry. A football match is held between the two schools annually. The official football "helmet" is given to the winning school for a year, until the next annual football match occurs. (Colors are red and black)
However, they currently have combined a football team between the two schools.

Elementary schools
Amerman Elementary School (Northville), grades K–5, known as the Bobcats, opened 1955, houses ALPS gifted learning program.
Moraine Elementary School (Northville Township), grades K–5, known as the Penguins, opened 1966. Moraine also houses the district wide Cross-Categorical classroom.
Ridgewood Elementary School (Northville Township), grades K–5, known as the Rockets, opened 2003.
Silver Springs Elementary School (Northville Township), known as the Eagles, grades K–5.
Thornton Creek Elementary School (Novi), grades K–5, known as the Gators, opened 1994. Thornton Creek also houses the District wide's ASD classroom, K–5 for moderately to severely challenged students with Autism.
Winchester Elementary School (Northville Township), grades K–5, known as the Dragons, opened 1975.

Special Education buildings
Cooke School, opened 2000, originally opened as Cooke Junior High School and became special education building after Hillside Middle School opened in former high school building.
Old Village School has 4 classrooms in Hillside Middle School in addition to its own building, was Northville High School in the early 1900s and later on an elementary school.

References

External links

Northville Public Schools official site

School districts in Michigan
Education in Oakland County, Michigan
Education in Washtenaw County, Michigan
Education in Wayne County, Michigan
Novi, Michigan